K-207 was a  state highway in the U.S. state of Kansas. K-207's southern terminus was at Interstate 70 (I-70), K-18 and the eastern terminus of K-207 Alt. in Junction City, and the northern terminus was at US-40 Bus. in Junction City. K-207 is now known as East Street.

K-207 was established in a September 24, 1958 resolution. It remained at the same alignment, until removed K-207 from the state highway system in a July 20, 1992 resolution.

Route description
K-207 began at a diamond interchange with I-70 and K-18, at current exit 298. It then headed north and immediately intersected the eastern terminus of K-207 Alternate. From here it continued north along East Street for a short distance before terminating at US-40 Business (6th Street).

The Kansas Department of Transportation (KDOT) tracks the traffic levels on its highways, and in 1991, they determined that on average the traffic was 625 vehicles between K-107 Alternate and its northern terminus.

History
K-207 was established in a September 24, 1958 resolution. The Kansas Department of Transportation removed K-207 from the state highway system in a July 20, 1992 resolution.

Major intersections

Alternate route

K-207 Alt. was a  state highway in the U.S. state of Kansas. K-207 Alt.'s western terminus was at US-77 Alt. and US-40 Bus. in Junction City and the eastern terminus was at Interstate 70 (I-70), K-18 and the southern terminus of K-207 in Junction City. K-207 Alt. was established in a September 9, 1959 resolution. The Kansas Department of Transportation removed K-207 Alt. from the state highway system in a July 20, 1992 resolution. In 1991, the average daily traffic was 1495 vehicles on K-107 Alternate. It is now known as Chestnut Street.

References

External links

Kansas Department of Transportation State Map
KDOT: Historic State Maps

207
Transportation in Geary County, Kansas